Juan Guillermo Figallo (born in Salta, March 25, 1988) is an Argentine former rugby union player. He began playing at Jockey Club de Salta and then was recruited  by the French side Montpellier in the Top 14. Figallo was called for the 2011 Rugby World Cup, being named "Player of Pool B" and the best tight-head prop at the competition. On 24 May 2014, Figallo signed for English club Saracens for the 2014/15 season. During his time at Saracens he has won three Premiership titles in 2015, 2016 and 2018. He also helped Saracens win the European Champions Cup in 2016.

With the Argentina National team, he has also played the Rugby Championship in 2012, 2013, 2018 and 2019 and was part of the squad for the 2011 Rugby World Cup in New Zealand, 2015 Rugby World Cup in England and 2019 Rugby World Cup in Japan. Figallo was not initially named in the squad in 2015 but was then called up to replace the injured Nahuel Tetaz Chaparro after the tournament started.

He announced his retirement in November 2020, having been unable to recover from a head injury sustained at the 2019 World Cup.

References

From aplenorugby.com.ar

External links
Juan Figallo International Statistics
Los Pumas Player Profile
itsrugby.co.uk Profile

1988 births
Living people
Argentine rugby union players
Argentina international rugby union players
Rugby union props
Montpellier Hérault Rugby players
People from Salta
Sportspeople from Salta Province